Hunters may refer to:

Television
Element Hunters, a 2009 anime children's television series
Hunters (2016 TV series), a 2016 American science-fiction series that aired on Syfy
Hunters (2020 TV series), a 2020 American drama web television series from Amazon Prime Video
"Hunters" (Star Trek: Voyager), an episode of Star Trek: Voyager

Video games
 Hunters (video game series), a 2010s mobile game series
 Hunters, a species of Combine Synths in Half-Life
 Hunters, a Covenant species in Halo
 Hunters, special infected in the game Left 4 Dead

Music
 Hunters (album), by The Residents
 The Hunters, a Dutch band whose members included Jan Akkerman
 The Hunters (instrumental band), a British band from the late 1950s to early 1960s

Sport
  Show hunter, a type of equestrian competition, informally called "Hunters"
 Chengdu Hunters, a Chinese esports team in the Overwatch League
 Porvoo Hunters, a Finnish ice hockey team

See also

 The Hunters (disambiguation)
 Hunter (disambiguation)
 Hunting (disambiguation)